Alfred Salom Eichberg (August 23, 1859 – May 15, 1921) was an architect in the U.S. state of Georgia. He designed the F. Rheinstein and Company Building (North Carolina), the New Hanover County Courthouse (North Carolina), and Brunswick City Hall (1889). He was Jewish.

He partnered with Calvin Fay (formerly of Sholl & Fay) to form Fay and Eichberg (1881-1888). They designed small buildings for the International Cotton Exposition (1881) in Atlanta and obtained larger commissions in Atlanta and Savannah including the Atlanta Chamber of Commerce, Telfair Hospital, and Central of Georgia Railway building (now called Eichberg Hall). He established his own firm in Savannah, Georgia. He employed Hyman Witcover as a draftsman and then partnered with him. He is buried at Oakland Cemetery in Atlanta.

References

1859 births
1921 deaths
Architects from Georgia (U.S. state)
Architects from Atlanta
19th-century American architects